Kerman carpets (sometimes "Kirman") are one of the traditional classifications of Persian carpets. Kerman is both a city and a province located in south central Iran, though the term sometimes describes a type which may have been made elsewhere. Kerman rugs are prized for a wide range of designs, a broad palette, use of natural dyes and fibers, great tensile strength and abrasion resistance, and expert color combinations. Typical manufacturing use an asymmetrical knot on cotton foundation, but rare examples imay include silk or part silk piles, or silk foundations with wool pile.

Designs and motifs of the Kerman region
Because of the tremendous demand for rugs produced in Kerman and the complex demographics of this demand, a surprising variety of styles and designs were produced. Some Kerman rugs were woven explicitly for monied buyers from the West, some for local consumers with very different tastes.

Damask Rose is the most popular motif in Kerman rug designs, particularly in "Sabzikar Ravar" and "Gol Sorkhi" (Red Rose) rugs. 
Other well-known motifs are "Ghab Ghora'ani", "Setooni", "Ghabi", "Kheshti", "Saraam Atiyeh", "Jangali", "Shekargah" and "Lachak-Toranj". Kerman antique carpets often use the Toranj motif border of margins and narrow lines. Floral patterns woven into Kerman carpets in the 19th century are derived from the patterns of Kerman shawls, also made in Kerman at this time. 

A distinct variation of Kerman carpets is the Lavar or Ravar Kerman. These carpets were produced in Ravar village next to Kerman city in the northern region and are known particularly for their fine weave and elegant, classically derived design of allover and central medallion formats. Most Ravar or Lavar Kerman carpets include a signature, either that of the weaver or the person for whom the carpet was woven. 

Vase carpets, a type of Kerman rug distinctive of the 16th and 17th centuries, are characterized by an allover pattern of stylized flowers and oversized palmettes with vases placed throughout the field.

Kerman carpets of the 18th century and later very often use "lattice" patterns, with the central field divided by a lattice design giving many small compartments. A notable illustration is a carpet having belonged to William Morris, now on display at the Victoria and Albert Museum. Later all sorts of designs were made in Kerman, including large figurative ones. The Victoria and Albert Museum in London has a carpet of 1909 with a design copying a painting by the 18th century French artist Antoine Watteau.

Modern Kerman rugs, made for western markets, are often woven in gentle and light colors such as amber, pink, and blue-gray. They may  employ western patterns, such as stripes and various repetitive motifs, as well as more traditional vase and garden themes, animal shapes, and pictorial designs.

Technique

May Beattie has defined seven classes of Kerman carpets and identified a unique structure she called the "Vase technique" characterised by three shoots of weft between rows of knots. The first and third are typically woolen and at high tension, while the second one, at low tension, is normally made of silk or cotton. Warps are markedly displaced and the Persian knot is open to the left. This technique distinguishes Kerman carpets from both the Safavid (1501-1722) and subsequent (1722-1834) periods. Most Persian carpets, in contrast, used the "Turkish knot". 

The dye process for Kerman carpets took place while the wool was still in flock and before spinning, allowing for uniform color. The palette for Kerman carpets is as brilliant as it is varied. Tones can range from ivory, blue and magenta to a more golden and saffron cast.

History

Kerman has been a major center for the production of high quality carpets since at least the 15th century. 

By the 17th century Kerman's designers were at their most inventive and their weaving techniques of a sophistication not seen in other parts of the Persian empire. For instance, the weavers had learned to set their looms so that the cotton warps were on two different levels. They then threaded the wool wefts, leaving some tight and others sinuous, giving an immediately recognisable wavy finish to the surface of the carpet

In the 18th century some authors considered the carpets from the province, especially at Siftan, to be the finest of all Persian carpets,  partly because of the high quality of the wool from the region, known as Carmania wool. 
Nader Shah, Naser al-Din Shah commissioned carpets from Kerman. in the 18th century.

By the 19th century, the city of Kerman had a long history of urban workshops, very fine wool, master weavers and a reputation for the artistic superiority of its designs.

Notes

References
 Maktabi, Hadi. "Under the Peacock Throne; Carpets, Felts and Silks in Persian Painting, 1736-1834", in Muqarnas, Volume 26, BRILL, 2009, 9789004175891, google books

 

Persian rugs and carpets